The 1927-28 French Rugby Union Championship of first division was won la Pau that beat the 'Quillan in the final.

Pau won its first Bouclier de Brennus.

Context 
The 1928 Five Nations Championship was won by Ireland, the France was last, hunted by the death of Yves du Manoir on January u,2.

Quillan was sustained by a rich businessman, Jean Bourrel, owner of a factory producing hats. 
The club, engaged a lot of players from other clubs, especially from US Perpignan. In the little city of Quillan, in Aude, all the players were employed in the Bourrel's factory. 
The club was accused of  "masked professionalism" but was not sufficient to win the title ( « Pau est French Champion : la morale est sauve. And the béret defeated chapeau. » )

First round

(3 point for each victory, 2 for a draw, 1 for a los)

In 6 of 8 pools tiebreakers were necessary.

 Pool A  Toulose 12 pt FC Lyon 8 pt Périgueux8 pt Montferrand6 pt Libourne 6 pt

 Pool B  Arlequins Perpignan 11 pt Stade Français 10 pt Dax 7 pt Agen 6 pt Grenoble 6 pt
 Pool C  Pau 11 pt Quillan 8 pt CA Bordeaux-Bègles Gironde 8 pt Limoges 8 pt Toulouse Olymp.EC 5 pt

 Pool D  SA Bordeaux 11 pt Béziers 8 pt CASG 8 pt Bayonne 7 pt Mazamet 6 pt

 Pool E  Hendaye 10 pt Lyon OU 9 pt Carcassonne 9 pt Albi 8 pt Stade Bagnères 4 pt

 Pool F US Perpignan 10 pt Lourdes 10 pt Cognac 8 pt Biarritz  8 pt Villeneuve 4 pt
 Pool G  Racing 10 pt SBUC 10 pt Lézignan 10 pt Montauban 6 pt Brive 4 pt

 Pool H Soustons 10 pt Toulon9 pt Narbonne 9 pt Pamiers 6 pt Stadoceste 6 pt

Second round

The first of each pool in semifinals

 Pool A  Toulouse 8 pt. Béziers 6 pt. Stade Bordelais 5 pt. Soustons 5 pt.
 Pool B  Pau 9 pt. Stade Français 7 pt. US Perpignan 5 pt. FC Lyon 3 pt.
 Pool C  US Quillan 8 pt. Arlequins Perpignan 7 pt. Lourdes 5 pt. Stade Hendayais 4 pt.
 Pool D  Touloun 9 pt. SA Bordeaux 5 pt. Racing Paris 5 pt. Carcassonne/ Lyon OU 5 pt.

(Carcassonne replace Lyon after one match)

Semifinals

Final

Notes

External links
Compte rendu de la finale de 1928, sur lnr.fr

1928
1927–28 rugby union tournaments for clubs
Championship